The 1996 United States Senate election in Montana took place on November 5, 1996. Incumbent United States Senator Max Baucus, who was first elected in 1978 and was re-elected in 1984 and 1990, ran for re-election. He was unopposed in the Democratic primary, and moved on to the general election, where he faced a stiff challenge in Denny Rehberg, the Lieutenant Governor of Montana and the Republican nominee. Despite Bob Dole's victory over Bill Clinton and Ross Perot in the state that year in the presidential election, Baucus managed to narrowly win re-election over Rehberg to secure a fourth term in the Senate.

Democratic primary

Candidates
 Max Baucus, incumbent United States Senator

Results

Reform primary

Candidates
 Becky Shaw, student loan investigator and 1994 candidate for the Democratic Senate nomination
 Webb Sullivan, retired railroad worker

Results

Republican primary

Candidates
 Denny Rehberg, Lieutenant Governor of Montana
 Ed Borcherdt, businessman
 John K. McDonald, former State Senator

Results

General election

Results

See also 
 1996 United States Senate elections

References 

Montana
1996
1996 Montana elections